Zoraida Buxó Santiago (born 1963) is a Puerto Rican politician currently serving as a Shadow United States Senator.

Early life and education 
Buxó was born in Puerto Rico in 1963. Completed a BA in Business Administration from the University of Puerto Rico.  She received a master's degree in law from George Washington University Law School and a J.D. from the University of Puerto Rico School of Law.

Career 

Buxó career experience includes working as a lawyer and in leadership roles with non-governmental organizations. in 1993 she worked as a legal advisor for public safety for the Governors of Puerto Rico office.  Served as Secretary of the Puerto Rico Department of Corrections and Rehabilitation from 1993 to 1995. She also worked in the office of the Governor of Puerto Rico and was a board member of the University of Puerto Rico.

In 2021, Buxó ran in the special election for U.S. Senate shadow delegatres representing Puerto Rico. She won the special general election on May 16, 2021, with 46,222 votes (27.35% of the vote) and assumed office July 1, 2021. Her current term ends on December 31, 2024.  

As a shadow Senator, Buxó will advocate that the U.S. Congress respect and enforce the results of the 2020 status referendum and admit Puerto Rico as the 51st state of the Union.

References

External links

1963 births
21st-century Puerto Rican politicians
21st-century Puerto Rican women politicians
Female United States senators
George Washington University Law School alumni
Living people
University of Puerto Rico alumni